The Beatrice M. Tinsley Prize is awarded every other year by the American Astronomical Society in recognition of an outstanding research contribution to astronomy or astrophysics of an exceptionally creative or innovative character. The prize is named in honor of the cosmologist and astronomer Beatrice Tinsley. 

The prize is normally awarded every second year, but was awarded in 2021 out of the established sequence.

Recipients

Recipients of the Beatrice M. Tinsley Prize include: 

 1986 Jocelyn Bell Burnell — discovery of first pulsar
 1988 Harold I. Ewen, Edward M. Purcell — discovery of 21 cm radiation from hydrogen
 1990 Antoine Labeyrie — speckle interferometry
 1992 Robert H. Dicke — lock-in amplifier
 1994 Raymond Davis, Jr. — neutrino detectors; first measurement of solar neutrinos
 1996 Aleksander Wolszczan — first pulsar planet
 1998 Robert E. Williams  — astronomical spectroscopy, particularly in gas clouds
 2000 Charles R. Alcock — search for massive compact halo objects
 2002 Geoffrey Marcy, R. Paul Butler, Steven S. Vogt — ultra-high-resolution Doppler spectroscopy; discovery of extrasolar planets by radial velocity measurements
 2004 Ronald J. Reynolds — studies of the interstellar medium
 2006 John E. Carlstrom — cosmic microwave background using the Sunyaev–Zeldovich effect
 2008 Mark Reid — astrometry experiments with the VLBI and the VLBA; pioneering use of cosmic masers as astronomical tools
 2010 Drake Deming — thermal infrared emission from transiting extrasolar planets
 2012 Ronald L. Gilliland — ultra-high signal-to-noise observations related to time-domain photometry
 2014 Chris Lintott — engaging non-scientists in cutting edge research
 2016 Andrew Gould — gravitational microlensing
 2018 Julianne Dalcanton — low-surface-brightness galaxies; Hubble Space Telescope surveys
 2020 Krzysztof Stanek, Christopher Kochanek — time-domain astronomy; leadership in the All Sky Automated Survey for SuperNovae (ASAS-SN)
 2021 Bill Paxton — MESA software for computational stellar astrophysics

See also

 List of astronomy awards

References

External links
Official website at the American Astronomical Society website

Astronomy prizes
Awards established in 1986
American awards
American Astronomical Society